Abdur Rahim Khan is an Indian politician. In 2011 he was elected as MLA of Barpera Vidhan Sabha Constituency in Assam Legislative Assembly. He is an Indian politician belonging to Indian National Congress party.

References

All India United Democratic Front politicians
Living people
1966 births